Top Country Albums is a chart that ranks the top-performing country music albums in the United States, published by Billboard.  In 2010, 14 different albums topped the chart; placings were based on electronic point of sale data from retail outlets.

The year both began and ended with albums by Taylor Swift at number one.  In the issue of Billboard dated January 2, her album Fearless held the top spot, its thirtieth week atop the chart.  It remained at number one for a further five weeks for a final total of 35 weeks in the peak position, the highest figure for an album since the soundtrack album of the film O Brother, Where Art Thou? spent the same length of time at number one in 2001 and 2002.  Fearless was displaced from the top spot in the issue dated February 13 by Need You Now by the group Lady Antebellum, which spent 24 consecutive weeks at number one, lasting through the issue dated July 24.  Swift returned to number one in November with Speak Now, which spent six of the final seven weeks of 2010, meaning that Swift was the only act with more than one number one during the year.  Need You Now and Speak Now were among a number of country albums to also top the all-genre Billboard 200 chart in 2010.

Five acts reached number one in 2010 for the first time.  In July, Jerrod Niemann gained his first chart-topper with Judge Jerrod & the Hung Jury, interrupting Lady Antebellum's time at number one for a single week.  In August, Blake Shelton reached number one for the first time in his career with the six-track EP All About Tonight.  Shelton had first entered both the country singles and albums charts in 2001 and had achieved a number of chart-topping singles, but had never managed to reach the top of the albums listing until 2010.  The band Little Big Town also reached the top spot on the country albums chart for the first time in 2010 after a lengthy wait; The Reason Why topped the chart in September more than eight years after the group first entered the chart.  The following month Jamey Johnson and the Zac Brown Band made their first appearances at number one in consecutive weeks with The Guitar Song and You Get What You Give respectively.  The latter album began an unbroken run of chart-toppers for the group; as of the end of the decade the band had reached number one with five consecutive albums.

Chart history

References

2010
United States Country Albums